Astana-1 formerly Nur-Sultan-1, is a railway station in Astana, Kazakhstan. The original station can handle 7,000 travellers a day, as part of the infrastructure build up to Expo 2017 a new station, Astana-Nurly Zhol, is located near Mynzhyldyk Alley with a new capacity of 12,000.

The station was renamed to Nur-Sultan-1 after the city changed its name. On 17 September 2022, the name of the city was changed to Astana and the station name was changed.

Train services
Around half of the train services serving Astana call at Astana-1. Most of these are "through" services as the newer Astana Nurly Zhol is a terminal station. Almost all Talgo services that serve Astana no longer serve Astana-1, but many long distance and commuter services remain at the station. A handful of services call at both Astana-1 and Nur Sultan Nurly Jol.

References

Railway stations in Akmola Region
Buildings and structures in Astana
Railway stations opened in 1929
Railway stations opened in 2003
Transport in Astana
1929 establishments in the Soviet Union